Leonardo Emanuel Landriel (born 14 July 1994) is an Argentine professional footballer who plays as a midfielder for Deportivo Riestra.

Career
Landriel's career began with Defensa y Justicia, he failed to make a first-team appearance though did appear on the substitutes bench once; versus Olimpo on 6 December 2014. Landriel was loaned to Primera C Metropolitana's Berazategui in 2016. Eleven appearances occurred. On 31 August 2017, Landriel joined Primera B Metropolitana side UAI Urquiza. His first appearance didn't arrive until the following March, with the midfielder making his bow in a draw with Villa San Carlos. Landriel netted his first senior goal on 15 May against Estudiantes. In June 2018, Ferro Carril Oeste of Primera B Nacional signed Landriel.

After eight appearances for Ferro, Landriel headed to Los Andes in July 2019. He scored on his first start for the club on 16 September against former club UAI Urquiza. August 2020 saw Landriel join fellow Primera B Metropolitana team Colegiales. Ahead of the 2022 season, Landriel signed with Deportivo Riestra.

Career statistics
.

References

External links

1994 births
Living people
People from Florencio Varela Partido
Argentine footballers
Association football midfielders
Primera C Metropolitana players
Primera B Metropolitana players
Primera Nacional players
Defensa y Justicia footballers
A.D. Berazategui footballers
UAI Urquiza players
Ferro Carril Oeste footballers
Club Atlético Los Andes footballers
Club Atlético Colegiales (Argentina) players
Deportivo Riestra players
Sportspeople from Buenos Aires Province